Cireşoaia may refer to several villages in Romania:

 Cireşoaia, a village in the town of Slănic-Moldova, Bacău County
 Cireşoaia, Bistriţa-Năsăud, a village in Braniștea, Bistrița-Năsăud

See also 
 Cireșu (disambiguation)